Colourbox is the only full-length studio album from Colourbox, released by 4AD in August 1985. CAD 508 is the album's catalogue number, used to distinguish it from the earlier mini-album of the same name. The first 10,000 copies of the vinyl LP came with a bonus LP MAD 509. The CD release included the first side of the bonus LP. The album was preceded by the singles "Say You" in March 1984, "Punch" in June 1984, and "The Moon Is Blue" in July 1985.

Track listing
All songs written by Steve and Martyn Young, except where noted.

 "Sleepwalker" – 2:16
 "Just Give 'em Whiskey" – 4:19
 "Say You" (U-Roy) – 3:58
 "The Moon Is Blue" – 4:37
 "Inside Informer" – 4:24
 "Punch" – 5:01
 "Suspicion" – 4:27
 "Manic" – 2:26
 "You Keep Me Hangin On" (Holland–Dozier–Holland) – 5:38
 "Arena" – 4:23

Personnel
 All instruments by Steve and Martyn Young.
 Vocals by Lorita Grahame.
 Guitar solo on "Manic" by William Orbit.
 Tablas on "Arena" by Chris Karan.
 Produced by Martyn Young, except "Punch" produced by Bob Carter.
 Recorded at Palladium, Guerilla, Rooster, and Maison Rouge.
 Mixed at Rooster, Guerilla, and Maison Rouge.
 "Arena" mixed by Hugh Jones at R.G. Jones.
 Engineered by Jon Turner (at Palladium), John Madden (at Rooster), and Rico (at Guerilla).
 Sleeve design by Vaughan Oliver.

Colourbox MAD 509

Colourbox MAD 509 is a mini-album by Colourbox. It was released as a free bonus record with the first 10,000 copies of Colourbox's self-titled album. The four tracks on the A-side were included on the CD version of CAD 508, while the three tracks on the B-side were not. The final track, "Sex Gun", is a vocal version of the original album instrumental "Just Give 'em Whiskey".

Track listing
 Side A
 "Edit the Dragon" – 2:44
 "Hipnition" – 3:01
 "We Walk Around the Streets" – 0:25
 "Arena II" – 5:01
 Side B
 "Manic II" – 5:54
 "Fast Dump" – 5:44
 "Sex Gun" – 4:02

References

1985 albums
4AD albums
Colourbox albums